Erinnyis guttularis is a species of moth in the family Sphingidae. It was described by Francis Walker in 1856. It is known from Cuba, Jamaica and the Dominican Republic.

References

Erinnyis
Moths described in 1856